Bergmania is a genus of butterflies in the family Lycaenidae.  The type species is Dipsas flamen Leech.

Lycaenidae
Lycaenidae genera